Bahianora is a genus of lichenized fungi in the family Lecideaceae. This is a monotypic genus, containing the single species Bahianora poeltii.

References

Lecideales
Lichen genera
Lecideales genera
Taxa named by Klaus Kalb
Taxa described in 1984